A book lung is a type of respiration organ used for atmospheric gas exchange that is present in many arachnids, such as scorpions and spiders. Each of these organs is located inside an open ventral abdominal, air-filled cavity (atrium) and connects with the surroundings through a small opening for the purpose of respiration.

Structure and function
Book lungs are not related to the lungs of modern land-dwelling vertebrates. Their name describes their structure and purpose. Stacks of alternating air pockets and tissue filled with hemolymph give them an appearance similar to a "folded" book.

Their number varies from just one pair in most spiders to four pairs in scorpions. The unfolded "pages" (plates) of the book lung are filled with hemolymph. The folds maximize the surface exposed to air, and thereby maximize the amount of gas exchanged with the environment. In most species, no motion of the plates is needed to facilitate this kind of respiration.

Occasionally absent
Sometimes, book lungs can be absent, and gas exchange is performed by the thin walls inside the cavity instead, with their surface area increased by branching into the body as thin tubes called tracheae. These tracheae may possibly have evolved directly from the book lungs because the tracheae in some spiders have a small number of greatly elongated chambers. Many arachnids, such as mites and harvestmen, have no traces of book lungs and breathe through tracheae or through their body-surfaces only.

Arachnid taxonomy
The absence or presence of book lungs divides the Arachnida into two main groups:

 The pulmonate arachnids
 book lungs present; Tetrapulmonata (whip scorpions, Schizomida, Amblypygi, and spiders) and scorpions
 The a-pulmonate arachnids
 book lungs absent; microwhip scorpions, harvestmen, Acarina, pseudoscorpions, Ricinulei and sunspiders

Tetrapulmonata have two pairs of book lungs found on the second and third abdominal segments (Schizomida have lost a pair, and most advanced spiders have replaced at least one of the pairs with trachea). Scorpions have four pairs of book lungs, found on abdominal segments number three, four, five and six.

The pulmonate arachnids also appears to be the only members of Arachnida where the respiratory pigment hemocyanin is present in their blood.

One of the long-running controversies in arachnid evolution is whether the book lung evolved from book gills just once in a common arachnid ancestor, or whether book lungs evolved separately in several groups of arachnids as they came onto land. While the third abdominal segment in Tetrapulmonata have book lungs, the scorpions have a pair of sensory organs called pectines instead.

The oldest book lungs have been recovered from extinct trigonotarbid arachnids preserved in the 410 million-year-old Rhynie chert of Scotland. These Devonian fossil lungs are almost indistinguishable from the lungs of modern arachnids, fully adapted to a terrestrial existence.

Book gills

It is believed that book lungs evolved from book gills. Although they have a similar book-like structure, book gills are external, while book lungs are internal. Both are considered appendages because book lungs develop from limb buds before the buds flatten into segmented lamellae. 

Book gills are still present in the marine arthropod Limulus (horseshoe crabs) which have five pairs of them, the flap in front of them being the genital operculum which lacks gills. Book gills are flap-like appendages that effect gas exchange within water and seem to have their origin as modified legs. On the inside of each appendage, over 100 thin page-like membranes, lamellae,  appearing as pages in a book, are where gas exchange takes place. These appendages move rhythmically to drive blood in and out of the lamellae and to circulate water over them. Respiration being their main purpose, they can also be used for swimming in young individuals. If they are kept moist, the horseshoe crab can live on land for many hours.

Footnotes

References

Arachnid anatomy
Invertebrate respiratory system
Spider anatomy